Racketeer Rabbit is a 1946 Warner Bros. Looney Tunes cartoon directed by Friz Freleng. The short was released on September 14, 1946, and features Bugs Bunny.

In the cartoon, Bugs duels with a pair of racketeers or gangsters, Rocky and Hugo, forerunners of Rocky and Mugsy who resemble Edward G. Robinson (Rocky, not to be confused with the aforementioned Rocky) and Peter Lorre (Hugo).

Plot
Bugs Bunny, looking for a place to spend the night, happens in an abandoned gothic farmhouse, which, unbeknownst to Bugs, is the hideout of two gangsters, Rocky and Hugo. Shortly thereafter, Rocky and Hugo return pursued by rival gangsters. The running gunfight continues as they take cover inside the farmhouse; Bugs comically gets up in the middle of the gunfight to use the bathroom and get a glass of water before returning to bed just as the shooting ends.

Later while Rocky is doling out his and Hugo's shares of the money from the heist they just pulled, Bugs slyly cuts in after noticing Rocky is not paying attention. He poses as several gang members until he gets all of the money. Rocky then wises up, and demands the money back. When Bugs refuses, Rocky has Hugo take Bugs for a ride. Bugs returns to the house without Hugo (who is absent from the rest of the cartoon, his fate unknown), and Rocky at first does not notice. When he does, he demands to know where the "dough" is, and after promising not to look (since Bugs does not want him to know where he hid it) gets a bowl of pie-dough in the face.

Bugs then poses as Mugsy, another gangster, who threatens that "It's curtains for you, Rocky", and then pulls an actual set of curtains from inside his jacket and hangs them over Rocky's head. Bugs then pretends to be a policeman and has Rocky hide inside a chest while he "deals with" the police. Bugs acts out the officer breaking in, ensuing in a fight over the chest which he is in, and play-acts a fight in which he eventually throws the imaginary cop out of a window. Before the phony fight, Bugs opens the chest and hands Rocky a time bomb, which soon detonates and leaves Rocky's clothes in shreds.

Rocky flees the house, screaming for the Police and not wanting to be left "with that crazy rabbit". Bugs sighs, "Some guys just can't take it, see? Yeah, yeah, yeah, yeah!".

Analysis
When entering the house, Bugs remarks "Huh? Sounds like Inner Sanctum!", a reference to the popular mystery radio program that aired from January 7, 1941, to October 5, 1952. Bugs impersonates Bugsy Siegel and flips a coin like George Raft in Scarface (1932). His Brooklynite accent serves to complete the image of a tough crook.

See also
 List of Bugs Bunny cartoons
 Bugs and Thugs in which Bugs Bunny treats Rocky and Mugsy to hide the villains' routine
Bah, Humduck! A Looney Tunes Christmas in which Bugs Bunny treats Daffy Duck to hide the villains' routine

References

External links

 
 

1946 films
1946 short films
1946 animated films
1940s American animated films
1940s Warner Bros. animated short films
Looney Tunes shorts
Short films directed by Friz Freleng
Films set in abandoned houses
American gangster films
Films scored by Carl Stalling
Cultural depictions of Edward G. Robinson
Cultural depictions of Peter Lorre
Bugs Bunny films
Films with screenplays by Michael Maltese
Rocky and Mugsy films